The spur-winged goose (Plectropterus gambensis) is a large bird in the family Anatidae, related to the geese and the shelducks, but distinct from both of these in a number of anatomical features, and therefore treated in its own subfamily, the Plectropterinae. It occurs in wetlands throughout sub-Saharan Africa.

Description

They are the largest African waterfowl and are, on average, the world's largest wild "goose", although in average weight, their size is at least rivaled by the Cape Barren goose. Spur-winged geese appear to be more closely allied to shelducks than "true geese" such as those from the Branta and Anser genera. They are mainly black, with a white face and large white wing patches. The long legs are pinkish red in colour. The nominate race P. g. gambensis has extensive white on the belly and flanks, but the smaller-bodied subspecies P. g. niger, which occurs south of the Zambezi River, has only a small white belly patch. From a distance, P. g. niger can appear to be all black.

The male differs from the female, not only in size, but also in having a larger red facial patch extending back from the red bill, and a knob at the base of the upper mandible. This is generally a quiet species. Typically, only males make a call, which consists of a soft bubbling cherwit when taking wing or alarmed. During breeding displays or in instances of alarm, both sexes may utter other inconspicuous calls.

Toxicity

The spur-winged goose is a toxic bird. This bird is often poisonous due to its diet of blister beetles. The poison, cantharidin, is held within the tissue of the bird resulting in poisoning of those that eat the cooked goose. A dose of 10 mg of cantharidin can kill a human.

Habitat
This species often occurs in open grasslands with lakes, seasonal pools, rivers, swamps and river deltas. It is also absent from arid zones.

Ecology
The spur-winged goose is gregarious, generally meeting in small flocks that contain up to 50 birds. They occur around various African rivers, lakes and swamps. Varied sites may be used for post-breeding moulting, in which case large numbers of the geese may congregate. This common species feeds by grazing, but spends the middle part of the day resting by water. Its diet consists predominantly of plant matter such as the vegetative parts and seeds of grasses, sedges and aquatic plants, agricultural grains, fruit (e.g. figs)  and tuberous crops, although it may occasionally supplement its diet with small fish or insects. Dispersal may occur in pursuit of feeding opportunities outside of the breeding season.

The breeding season for spur-winged geese is variable across the range. In the north, breeding generally occurs from August to December, in eastern Africa from January to June and in southern Africa from August to May. This species is highly aggressive to other waterfowl (including conspecifics) during the breeding season. At this time of the year, the geese may violently put the spur on the bend of the wings to use in conflicts with other birds. Adult male geese are especially prone to attacking other adult males. The large nest is usually concealed in vegetation near water, but tree holes, cavities in rocks, old hamerkop, African fish eagle or social weaver nests and even the top of a termite mound and an aardvark burrow have been used as nests. Generally, they prefer quiet, undisturbed stretches of riverbank and wetlands for nest sites.

Status
The spur-winged goose is a common bird of African wetlands. Perhaps the main threat to the species is development and destruction of wetland habitats and unregulated hunting. A counting survey of the population in western Africa wetlands from Senegal to Chad in early 1977 produced a count of 10,000 geese, mostly being found in the Niger basin. This bird is one of the species to which the Agreement on the Conservation of African-Eurasian Migratory Waterbirds (AEWA) applies.

References

External links

Species text in The Atlas of Southern African Birds
Death by toxic goose

spur-winged goose
Birds of Sub-Saharan Africa
spur-winged goose
spur-winged goose
Toxic birds